Borpatragohain was the third of the three great Gohains (counsellors) in the Ahom kingdom. This position was created by Suhungmung Dihingia Raja in the year 1527 when Koncheng was made the first Borpatrogohain. The designation was borrowed from Vrihat-patra, the Habung dependent of the Chutiya king. 

The other two counselors of the Ahom kingdom, the Burhagohain and the Borgohain, strongly opposed the creation of this office, but the king successfully instituted this by claiming that three ministers are now required to stabilize the kingdom.  Suhungmung claimed that Konsheng, a formidable warrior was his half-brother who grew up in a Naga chieftain's house. Since the other two counselors refused to transfer part of the militia (hatimur) they commanded to the new office, Suhungmung transferred non-Ahom militia under himself to the Borpatragohain and part of the Ahom militia from the other two counselors to himself. To placate the aggrieved two counselors, Suhungmung created two additional frontier Gohain positions that were exclusive to the two lineages, and ruled that the Borpatragohain's family could not have any marital relationship with the king's lineage. 

In later times, people from non-Ahoms families, like those of Garhgayan Patar and Maran Patar were also made Borpatragohain in later times. and administered the region from the Daphla Hills to the Brahmaputra, and between the Gerelua and Pichalua rivers.

List of Borpatragohains
 Kon-Sheng
 Klan-Jang
 Ban Jangi
 Laku Borpatragohain
 Banchangia Borpatragohain
 Lai Borpatragohain
 Chereli Borpatragohain
 Bhaga Borpatragohain
 Achuk Borpatragohain 
 Kenduguria Sengkong Borpatragohain
 Paramananda Borpatragohain
 Kalugayan Harinath Borpatragohain
 Kenduguria Mrittunjay Borpatragohain
 Redeshwar Borpatragohain 
 Maran Borpatragohain
 Kenduguria Rudresvar Borpatragohain

Notes

Bibliography

 Gait, Edward (1905) History of Assam, Calcutta
 
 

 Assamese-language surnames